A mountain pass is a navigable route through a mountain range or over a ridge. Since many of the world's mountain ranges have presented formidable barriers to travel, passes have played a key role in trade, war, and both human and animal migration throughout history. At lower elevations it may be called a hill pass. A mountain pass is typically formed between two volcanic peaks or created by erosion from water or wind.

Overview 

Mountain passes make use of a gap, saddle, col or notch. A topographic saddle is analogous to the mathematical concept of a saddle surface, with a saddle point marking the highest point between two valleys and the lowest point along a ridge. On a topographic map, passes are characterized by contour lines with an hourglass shape, which indicates a low spot between two higher points.

Passes are often found just above the source of a river, constituting a drainage divide. A pass may be very short, consisting of steep slopes to the top of the pass, or a valley many kilometers long, whose highest point might only be identifiable by surveying.

Roads have long been built through passes, as well as railways more recently. Some high and rugged passes may have tunnels bored underneath a nearby mountainside, as with the Eisenhower Tunnel bypassing Loveland Pass in the Rockies, to allow faster traffic flow throughout the year.

The top of a pass is frequently the only flat ground in the area, and is a high vantage point. In some cases this makes it a preferred site for buildings. If a national border follows a mountain range, a pass over the mountains is typically on the border, and there may be a border control or customs station, and possibly a military post as well. The border runs north–south along the Andes mountains, with a total of 42 mountain passes. 

On a road over a pass, it is customary to have a small roadside sign giving the name of the pass and its elevation above mean sea level.

Apart from offering relatively easy travel between valleys, passes also provide a route between two mountain tops with a minimum of descent. As a result, it is common for tracks to meet at a pass; this often makes them convenient routes even when travelling between a summit and the valley floor. Passes traditionally were places for trade routes, communications, cultural exchange, military expeditions etc. A typical example is the Brenner pass in the Alps.

Some mountain passes above the tree line have problems with snow drift in the winter. This might be alleviated by building the road a few meters above the ground, which will make snow blow off the road.

Synonyms 

There are many words for pass in the English-speaking world. In the United States, pass is very common in the West, the word gap is common in the southern Appalachians, notch in parts of New England, and saddle in northern Idaho. The term col, derived from Old French, is also used, particularly in Europe.

In the highest mountain range in the world, the Himalayas, passes are denoted by the suffix "La" in Tibetan, Ladhakhi, and several other regional languages. Examples are the Taglang La at 5,328 m (17,480 ft) on the Leh-Manali highway, or the Sia La at 5,589 m (18,337 ft) in the Eastern Karakoram range.

Scotland has the Gaelic term bealach (anglicised "balloch"), while Wales has the similar bwlch (both being insular Celtic languages). In the Lake District of north-west England, the term hause is often used, although the term pass is also common—one distinction is that a pass can refer to a route, as well as the highest part thereof, while a hause is simply that highest part, often flattened somewhat into a high-level plateau.

In Japan they are known as tōge, which means "pass" in Japanese. The word can also refer to narrow, winding roads that can be found in and around mountains and geographically similar areas.

Around the world 

Gallery

See also

References

Notes

Bibliography

External links 
 

 
Montane ecology
Oronyms
Slope landforms
Walking
Adventure travel
Tourist activities
Geography